Casalfiumanese is a comune (municipality) in the Metropolitan City of Bologna in the Italian region Emilia-Romagna, located about  southeast of Bologna.

Casalfiumanese borders the following municipalities: Borgo Tossignano, Castel del Rio, Castel San Pietro Terme, Dozza, Fontanelice, Imola, Monterenzio. A reinforced concrete bridge over the Santerno River connects Casalfiumanese to Fontanelice.

Sights
San Martino di Pedriolo, Casalfiumanese

People
Luca Ghini
Pope Honorius II

Twin towns
 Rotondella, Italy

References

Cities and towns in Emilia-Romagna